The Ghostway is the sixth crime fiction novel in the Joe Leaphorn / Jim Chee Navajo Tribal Police series by Tony Hillerman. It was first published in 1984 and features Jim Chee.

A gunfight at a laundromat in Shiprock NM brings Los Angeles problems to the Navajo reservation.

The novel was reviewed positively at its publication. "The tension between the Navajo way-of-life and the tempting white-world outside. . . is central and emphatic" in this novel. The central character "Chee is developed to greater depth than before", though that reviewer felt that the three novels featuring Leaphorn (first three in this series) were more powerful. Another called this novel choice reading. Another review found that the story "moves alertly along" and is "one of the best in the series."

Plot summary

Hosteen Joseph Joe, finishing his laundry in Shiprock, New Mexico, answers questions put by a man in a new car, about Leroy Gorman. Joe does not know that man, but studies the Polaroid photo of him in front of his aluminum trailer home, set next to a cottonwood tree in fall. A second car appears, driven by Lerner, who chastises the first driver. After a gun battle, Lerner is dead on the ground. The other man drives away.

Sgt. Jim Chee finds the place where the first man drove, the hogan of Ashie Begay. With FBI agents Sharkey and Witrey, and Deputy Bales, Chee finds Albert Gorman buried near what is now a death hogan, but not the photo Joseph Joe described. Gorman was buried almost exactly following the Navajo way, save for his unwashed hair. Returning a week later, Chee encounters runaway Margaret Billy Sosi, crying for her grandfather. They talk, she slips away. Chee next finds the aluminum trailer shown in the photo, where he expects to find Leroy Gorman, but the man there is Grayson. Margaret Sosi had shown up earlier that day, looking for her grandfather. In search of Sosi and her relatives, Chee drives 900 mi to Los Angeles. He meets two city police detectives, Shaw and Wells, who know the FBI agent Upchurch who died or was killed in trying to close a nine-year case on the McNair gang, experts in high priced car thievery and the cocaine trade, who leave no witnesses.

Chee patiently speaks with Mr Berger, resident of the old people’s home near Gorman’s place. They saw Sosi visit the day before, and saw Gorman argue with a big blond man – Vaggan. Gorman showed them the photo of his brother at his trailer. Then Gorman left. They knew he stole cars for his living. With help from Shaw, Chee gets the address for Gorman’s next of kin. Chee meets Bentwoman, the grandmother of Ashie Begay. Margaret Sosi has been there and will return there after dark. Bentwoman advises Chee to enter his hogan, as he is dead but no one died in his home. Leaving, Chee encounters Vaggan and Margaret in the empty street. Chee jumps Vaggan, Vaggan beats up Chee, Margaret gets Vaggan's gun and runs the show; she makes Vaggan drive Chee to the hospital. Shaw comes to the hospital where Chee is recovering from head wounds. Chee recalls the arsenal in Eric Vaggan’s van. He realizes what Margaret did, but how? Shaw learns the new lawyer at DA office handling the McNair case is not helpful. Chee will pursue Margaret Sosi, who has left Bentwoman’s home.

During his three days in a Los Angeles hospital, Chee calls Mary Landon. He is really in love with her. He re-evaluates his choice about her and his home. Chee drives back to Shiprock, stopping at Flagstaff. The gang knew Gorman was heading for his brother. Vaggan tried to stop him, failed, so Lerner was sent to kill Gorman. He reports to Capt. Largo. Largo knows Leroy Gorman is Grayson in the Witness Protection by checking who paid for his trailer. While Chee is on sick leave, he gets a horse to find Margaret Sosi and that picture. At Begay’s hogan, Chee finds the sacred items Begay would not leave behind. He searches until he finds two dead horses, shot in the head, one still standing, covered with snow. Then he finds the rest of Begay’s property and the corpse of Begay, killed as the horses were, in the head. But he has not yet found Margaret or the elusive photo. Chee visits his uncle to learn who performs the Ghostway ceremony. He learns where the sing for Margaret is happening.

Margaret Sosi is finishing the last day of the Ghostway sing to purify her from being in the death hogan, surrounded by her clan. Jim Chee arrives at the meal break before the last part of the sing. He tells her that her grandfather is dead and then asks her what was on the postcard from her grandfather. She left it at school, but it has the words "don’t trust nobody -- Leroy" written across it. He calls Grayson/Leroy Gorman to meet his own clan at the ceremony. After Gorman arrives, Chee realizes that the real Leroy Gorman is dead and Grayson is part of the gang, maybe Beno or any Navajo in the gang – explaining why Lerner was sent to kill Albert Gorman before Albert found the aluminum trailer. The Ghostway ends at dawn; Chee leaves with Margaret. Grayson drives away, to meet Vaggan in the nearby empty old hogan. Chee and Margaret drive into an ambush on the road. While Chee is forced to the ground, Margaret shoots Vaggan with his own pistol. Beno (aka Grayson) is unarmed, gives up, and is arrested by FBI agents at the Cañoncito Reservation police station. Margaret goes back to school.

At home, Chee finds a long letter from Mary, who realizes she cannot change her Jim Chee from being a Navajo, and will go home to Wisconsin to think more about it.

Characters

Jim Chee: Officer in the Navajo Tribal Police, working from Shiprock, Arizona office, under Captain Largo for two years.
Sharkey: FBI agent in the Gorman case.
Witrey: assistant to Sharkey.
Bales: Deputy in San Juan County Sheriff’s office.
Captain Largo: Superior to Chee in Navajo Tribal Police at Shiprock office.
Mary Landon: Teacher of fifth-grade Navajo students, white woman from Wisconsin, Chee loves her, but she ended it before story began.
Albert A. Gorman: Driver of car who asked questions of Joseph Joe. He was found later buried near the hogan of Hosteen Begay. He is Navajo but raised in Los Angeles.
Leroy Gorman: Brother of Albert Gorman, who he seeks in Shiprock, shown in photo to Joseph Joe.
Lerner: Driver of second car at laundromat, killed by Albert Gorman.
Hosteen Joseph Joe: Navajo man, age 81, stopped by Albert Gorman, shown photo of Leroy Gorman at his Airstream trailer.
Hosteen Ashie Begay: Uncle of Albert Gorman, who died at his hogan, now a death hogan. He is also grandfather to Margaret Billy Sosi.
Margaret Billy Sosi: Granddaughter to Hosteen Ashie Begay; 17 years old; lives with her grandfather when not attending Saint Catherine’s boarding school in Santa Fe NM. She is young, slender and decisive.
Miss Pinot: Friend of Margaret at the boarding school.
Mr Bergen: older man, stroke victim, who lives at Silver Threads rest home, knew Albert Gorman.
Grayson: Navajo man in Witness Protection program in Shiprock, living in the aluminum trailer.
Willie Shaw: Arson department detective sergeant in Los Angeles police department, short man, bent on getting McNair gang in Los Angeles. Near retirement, and friend to Upchurch.
Wells: Arson department detective in Los Angeles police department, large man.
Kenneth Upchurch: FBI agent who died after putting witnesses in protection program, in pursuit of ringleaders of gang of high priced car thieves.
George McNair: head of gang of thieves recently arrested by Agent Upchurch.
Robert Beno: part of McNair gang, a Navajo who runs the thievery part of operations. He was indicted but never picked up by police. He poses as Grayson.
Eric Vaggan: the “regular muscle” for McNair’s gang in Los Angeles, a grisly predator and nuclear war survivalist. Large, blond haired man.
Bentwoman Tsossie: Grandmother to Ashie Begay, and next of kin to Albert Gorman in Los Angeles.
Hosteen Little Ben: Yataalii who does the Ghostway ceremony for Margaret Billy Sosi. He is the youngest Navajo who knows how to do this ceremony.

Geography
In his 2011 book Tony Hillerman's Navajoland: Hideouts, Haunts, and Havens in the Joe Leaphorn and Jim Chee Mysteries, author  has listed the following 63 geographical locations, real and fictional, mentioned in The Ghost Way. 

Acoma Pueblo, NM
Albuquerque, NM
Balakai Mesa
Blanca Peak, CO
Blue Gap, AZ
Borrego Pass (Trading Post), NM
Burnham, NM
Cañoncito, NM
Carrizo Mountains, AZ
Carson Mesa, AZ
Chinle, AZ
Chuska Mountains, NM & AZ
Cottonwood, AZ
Crownpoint, NM
Dinnebito Wash, AZ
Dinnehotso (Trading Post), AZ
Farmington, NM
Flagstaff, AZ
Gallup, NM
Ganado, AZ
Grants, NM
Gray Mountain, AZ
Greasewood Flats, AZ
Hesperus Peak, CO
Jemez (Pueblo), NM
Kayenta, AZ
Keams Canyon, AZ
Laguna Pueblo, NM
Little Pajarito Arroyo, NM
Little Water, NM
Lukachukai Mountains, AZ
Mancos Creek, CO & NM
Many Farms, AZ
Mesa Gigante, NM
Mexican Water, AZ
Moenkopi Plateau, AZ
Mount Hesperus, CO
Mount Taylor, NM
Navajo Mountain, UT & AZ
Newcomb, NM
Owl Spring, NM
Red Mesa, AZ
Red Mesa Chapter, AZ
Rio Puerco (of the East), NM
Round Rock, AZ
Salt Creek Wash, NM
Sandia Mountains, NM
San Francisco Peaks, AZ
Sangre de Cristo Mountains, CO & NM
San Juan Basin, NM
San Juan River, CO, NM, & UT
Santa Fe, NM
Sheep Springs, NM
Shiprock (Community), NM
Shiprock (Pinnacle), NM
Tah Chee Wash, AZ
Teec Nos Pos, AZ
Tuba City, AZ
Toadlena, NM
Two Grey Hills, NM
Two Story Trading Post, AZ
Tyende Creek, AZ
Window Rock, AZ

Reviews

Kirkus Reviews finds this novel has some pockets of sentimentality, but keeps the crucial features of the novel in compelling balance:

The tension between the Navajo way-of-life and the tempting white-world outside--always an element in Hillerman's somber outings for Jim Chee of the Navajo Tribal Police--is central and emphatic in this haunting, absorbing investigation. Throughout the novel, Jim broods (sometimes too ponderously) on his relationship with non-Navajo teacher Mary Landon, who has been pressuring him to take a job outside the reservation. But, more effectively, the crime-puzzles here relentlessly circle around the issue of Navajo identity. Albert Gorman, a Navajo who moved to L.A. and became a car-thief, returns to the reservation, apparently looking for his brother Leroy--and is wounded in a shootout with a pursuing L.A. hitman. Soon thereafter, Albert's body is found--ceremonially laid out--near the hogan of his grandfather, Hosteen Begay. But where is Hosteen Begay now? Where is brother Leroy? And where is young Margaret Billy Sosi, another of Hosteen Begay's grandchildren, who has disappeared from her Navajo school? To answer these questions, Jim makes a rare trip outside the reservation--to LA., where he learns that the Gorman brothers were involved with a powerful local gang, that Leroy had agreed to testify against the gang-leaders, becoming a federally protected witness. He finds Margaret Billy Sosi, then loses her again (after she saves him from a gang assassin); he has touching encounters with an elderly friend of the late Albert Gorman, with some of the few Navajos living in L.A. And finally, after returning home and finding the body of Hosteen Begay, Jim brings all the clues and themes together in a strong final twist--one that also helps him to accept a gentle compromise from Mary Landon. Despite pockets of excess sentimentality: one of Hillerman's best Navajo mysteries--keeping suspense, Indian lore, and character in stately yet compelling balance.

Marcia Muller writes that "While not as powerful as the Leaphorn novels, The Ghostway ties its thematic matter into the plot in an extremely satisfying way, and Chee is developed to greater depth than before. Any reader will be eager to see how he resolves his conflicts in future novels."

Alice Cromie, writing in the Chicago Tribune, likes this novel, finding it choice reading. "Neatly, Hillerman weaves a Navajo superstition into whether Chee will enter a hogan that may contain a dead Navajo`s ghost."

Newgate Callendar, writing in the New York Times, says this novel "maintains the high standard of its predecessors." In contrast with Muller's view, Callendar says this novel "moves alertly along, has all the flavor and exoticism one associates with Mr. Hillerman and is one of the best in the series."

References

Bibliography

External links
HarperCollins browse the book
The Ghostway at Tony Hillerman Portal

Novels by Tony Hillerman
1985 American novels
Harper & Row books
Novels set in Arizona
Novels set in Los Angeles
Novels set in New Mexico